Skelethon is the sixth studio album by American hip hop artist Aesop Rock. It was released through Rhymesayers Entertainment on July 10, 2012.

Music 
The album is entirely produced by Aesop Rock himself. Guest appearances include Allyson Baker, Hanni El Khatib, Rob Sonic, Kimya Dawson, Murs, and Blueprint. The album's artwork was done by Aryz.

Release 
Music videos were created for "Zero Dark Thirty", "ZZZ Top", and "Cycles to Gehenna". A music video for "ZZZ Top" features the martial arts master Patti Li.

The album debuted at number 21 on the Billboard 200 with 14,000 copies sold in its first week. It has sold over 52,000 copies as of April 2016.

Critical reception
At Metacritic, which assigns a weighted average score out of 100 to reviews from mainstream critics, Skelethon received an average score of 79% based on 27 reviews, indicating "generally favorable reviews".

It was listed by HipHopDX as one of the "Top 25 Albums of 2012".

Track listing

Charts

References

External links
 

2012 albums
Aesop Rock albums
Rhymesayers Entertainment albums